The Colonial National Invitation, titled for sponsorship reasons as the Charles Schwab Challenge since 2019, is a professional golf tournament in Texas on the PGA Tour, played annually in May in Fort Worth at Colonial Country Club, which organizes the event.  It is one of five invitational tournaments on the PGA Tour; the inaugural event was held  in 1946.

Overview
The tournament was founded  in 1946, and honors the history of golf by using an official Scottish tartan plaid jacket for its champions and top committee chairmen. Another tradition feeding Colonial history is the Wall of Champions on the first tee, engraved with the name and score of each champion dating back to 1946, plus the 1975 Tournament Players Championship, 1941 U.S. Open, and 1991 U.S. Women's Open. 

The tournament is unofficially associated with Ben Hogan (1912–1997), the long-time Fort Worth resident who won the tournament five times, the most of any player. One of the top players in golf history, he won nine major titles, six after a near-fatal automobile collision in 1949 that kept him hospitalized for two months. Hogan's final three major wins were consecutive in 1953; a statue of him at swing completion is near the clubhouse.

Annika Sörenstam played in the 2003 tournament and became the first woman to play in a PGA Tour event in 58 years, since Babe Zaharias made three cuts as an amateur in 1945. Sörenstam's participation drew high media attention, but she shot 71 and 74 and missed the cut by four strokes.

In 2020, the tournament was held June 11–14 as the first PGA Tour event staged since the interruption of the regular schedule in mid-March due to the COVID-19 pandemic. In the interests of maximum health and safety, the event had no spectators, a PGA Tour first.

Sponsors
The Charles Schwab Corporation became the title sponsor of the event for a four-year deal starting in 2019.

Previous sponsors were Dean & Deluca (2016–2017), Crowne Plaza (2007–2015), Bank of America (2003–2006), MasterCard (1996–2002), and Southwestern Bell (1989–1994). There was no title sponsor in 1995 or 2018.

The event name had "Colonial" in its title through 2015, when the Crowne Plaza Invitational at Colonial was renamed the Dean & DeLuca Invitational.  Even the unsponsored 2018 event used the name Fort Worth Invitational, as opposed to "Colonial National Invitation" which was used the last time the event was without a sponsor back in 1995.

The 2018 tournament, renamed the Fort Worth Invitational, was held through the support of four local corporate supporters that had stepped-in to provide financial support after Dean & DeLuca suddenly pulled-out of a six-year sponsorship agreement.  American Airlines, AT&T, XTO Energy Inc. and Burlington Northern Santa Fe Railway agreed to help fund the 2018 tournament to allow time for the PGA TOUR and Colonial Country Club to find a new sponsor.

Invitational status
The Charles Schwab Challenge is one of only five tournaments given "invitational" status by the PGA Tour, and consequently it has a reduced field of approximately 120 players (as opposed to most full-field open tournaments with a field of 144 or 156 players).  The other four tournaments with invitational status are the Genesis Open, Arnold Palmer Invitational, the RBC Heritage, and the Memorial Tournament.  However, the 2020 event was staged with 144 players to help make up for the loss of several tournaments canceled earlier in the year.

Invitational tournaments have smaller fields (between 120 and 132 players), and have more freedom than full-field open tournaments in determining which players are eligible to participate in their event, as invitational tournaments have slightly different criteria for player eligibility in the PGA Tour Priority Ranking System.  Furthermore, unlike full-field open tournaments, invitational tournaments do not offer open qualifying (aka Monday qualifying).

Field
The field consists of at least 120 players invited using the following criteria:
 Colonial winners prior to 2000 and in the last five years
 Colonial Winners in top 150 of prior year FedEx Cup points list
 The Players Championship and major championship winners in the last five years
 The Tour Championship and World Golf Championships winners in the past three years
 Arnold Palmer Invitational and Memorial winners in the past three years
 PGA Tour tournament winners since the last Colonial tournament
 Playing members on the last named U.S. Ryder Cup team
 Current PGA Tour members who were playing members on the last named European Ryder Cup team, U.S. Presidents Cup team, and International President's Cup team
 Two players to be selected by the current and former champions of the Colonial tournament (Champions Choices)
 Top 15 finishers and ties from previous year's Colonial Tournament
 12 sponsors exemptions -- 2 from among graduates of Web.com Tour finals, 6 members not otherwise exempt, and 4 unrestricted
 Top 50 Official World Golf Ranking through the Masters
 Top 80 from prior year's FedEx Cup points list
 Members in the top 125 non-member category whose non-WGC points for the previous season equal or exceed the points earned by the player finishing in 80th position on the prior year FedEx Cup points list
 Top 80 from current year's FedEx Cup points list through the tournament two weeks prior
 If necessary to complete a field of 120 players, any remaining positions are filled from current year's FedEx Cup points list

Colonial winners prior to 2000 that are not otherwise eligible are in addition to a field of 120.

Champion's Choice tradition
Colonial has a unique PGA Tour tradition known as the Champion's Choice invitation.  Each year, former Colonial champions select two deserving young players, who otherwise would be ineligible, to compete in the tournament.

Pros who made their first appearance at Colonial as a Champion's Choice include Al Geiberger, Tom Weiskopf, Craig Stadler, Curtis Strange, Mark O'Meara, Paul Azinger, Davis Love III, and Jordan Spieth.  Five Champion's Choices have eventually won the Colonial; Dave Stockton is the only Champion's Choice to win the tournament in the year selected (1967).

Course layout

Source:

Winners

Note: Green highlight indicates scoring records.
Sources:

Multiple winners
Eleven men have won this tournament more than once through 2019.

5 wins
Ben Hogan: 1946, 1947, 1952, 1953, 1959
2 wins

Julius Boros: 1960, 1963
Billy Casper: 1964, 1968
Lee Trevino: 1976, 1978
Ben Crenshaw: 1977, 1990
Bruce Lietzke: 1980, 1992

Corey Pavin: 1985, 1996
Nick Price: 1994, 2002
Kenny Perry: 2003, 2005
Phil Mickelson: 2000, 2008
Zach Johnson: 2010, 2012

Notes

References

External links

Coverage on PGA Tour's official site

PGA Tour events
Golf in Texas
Sports in Fort Worth, Texas
InterContinental Hotels Group
Recurring sporting events established in 1946
1946 establishments in Texas